Edward Joseph Connolly (July 17, 1908 – November 12, 1963) was a backup catcher in Major League Baseball who played his entire career for the Boston Red Sox between  and . Connolly batted and threw right-handed. He was born in Brooklyn, New York. His son, Ed Jr., also played briefly in the majors.

In a four-season career, Connolly was a .178 hitter (66-for-371) with 31 RBI without any home runs in 149 games played.

Connolly died in Pittsfield, Massachusetts, at the age of 55.

See also
List of second-generation Major League Baseball players

External links

1908 births
1963 deaths
Boston Red Sox players
Galveston Buccaneers players
Jersey City Skeeters players
Kansas City Blues (baseball) players
Major League Baseball catchers
Pittsfield Hillies players
Sportspeople from Brooklyn
Baseball players from New York City